Tobi 1 - Coptic Calendar - Tobi 3

The second day of the Coptic month of Tobi, the fifth month of the Coptic year. On a common year, this day corresponds to December 28, of the Julian Calendar, and January 10, of the Gregorian Calendar. This day falls in the Coptic season of Peret, the season of emergence.

Commemorations

Saints 

 The martyrdom of Saint Callinicus, Bishop of Oseem 
 The departure of Pope Theonas, the 16th Patriarch of the See of Saint Mark 
 The departure of Saint Youna

References 

Days of the Coptic calendar